Paihia is the main tourist town in the Bay of Islands in the  Northland Region of the North Island of New Zealand. It is 60 kilometres north of Whangārei, located close to the historic towns of Russell and Kerikeri.  Missionary Henry Williams named the mission station Marsden's Vale. Paihia eventually became the accepted name of the settlement.

Nearby to the north is the historic settlement of Waitangi, and the residential and commercial area of Haruru Falls is to the west. The port and township of Opua, and the small settlement of Te Haumi, lie to the south.

History and culture

Origin of the Name
The origin of the name "Paihia" is unclear. A popular attribution, most likely apocryphal, is that when Reverend Henry Williams first arrived in the Bay of Islands searching for a location for his mission station, he told his Māori guide, "Pai here," meaning "Good here," as his Māori vocabulary was limited.

European settlement

Henry Williams and his wife Marianne settled in Paihia in 1823 and built the first church there the same year. William Williams and his wife Jane joined the Paihia mission in 1826. Bishop William Grant Broughton (the first and only Bishop of Australia) visited the Paihia mission in 1838 and performed several firsts in New Zealand including the first Confirmation and Ordination ceremonies.

 was a 55-ton schooner that the missionaries built and launched off the beach at Paihia on 24 January 1826.

In December 1832 the first mention of cricket being played in New Zealand was recorded by Henry Williams. In 1835 a game of cricket was witnessed here by Charles Darwin, in December 1835 while the Beagle spent 10 days in the Bay of Islands.

In 1835 William Colenso set up the first printing press in New Zealand at Paihia.

In 1850 the mission closed and Paihia declined to a very small settlement by 1890.

20th century

St. Paul's Anglican Church, completed in 1925, is the fifth church built on the site. It is constructed of stone quarried from the Pukaru locality, near Kawakawa, and timber from near Waikare. The triptych stained glass windows above the pulpit were commissioned by the Williams Family Trust in commemoration of Sir Nigel Reed for the 175 year family reunion and installed by the artist in 1998. The windows, titled Te Ara O Te Manawa (Pathway of the Heart), are 4 m2 in total size.

In 1926 a road was constructed to Puketona on the main road from Kawakawa to Kerikeri (now State Highway 10) leading to an increase in tourism in the 1930s.

Demographics

Paihia had a population of 1,512 at the 2018 New Zealand census, an increase of 222 people (17.2%) since the 2013 census, and an increase of 213 people (16.4%) since the 2006 census. There were 561 households, comprising 765 males and 750 females, giving a sex ratio of 1.02 males per female. The median age was 45.4 years (compared with 37.4 years nationally), with 207 people (13.7%) aged under 15 years, 306 (20.2%) aged 15 to 29, 654 (43.3%) aged 30 to 64, and 345 (22.8%) aged 65 or older.

Ethnicities were 69.0% European/Pākehā, 35.3% Māori, 3.6% Pacific peoples, 6.5% Asian, and 2.0% other ethnicities. People may identify with more than one ethnicity.

The percentage of people born overseas was 25.4, compared with 27.1% nationally.

Although some people chose not to answer the census's question about religious affiliation, 50.2% had no religion, 35.9% were Christian, 4.0% had Māori religious beliefs, 1.8% were Hindu, 0.2% were Muslim, 0.4% were Buddhist and 1.6% had other religions.

Of those at least 15 years old, 168 (12.9%) people had a bachelor's or higher degree, and 210 (16.1%) people had no formal qualifications. The median income was $25,000, compared with $31,800 nationally. 123 people (9.4%) earned over $70,000 compared to 17.2% nationally. The employment status of those at least 15 was that 603 (46.2%) people were employed full-time, 219 (16.8%) were part-time, and 63 (4.8%) were unemployed.

Marae
Te Tii Waitangi marae and Te Tiriti o Waitangi meeting house in Te Tī Bay at the northern end of Paihia are affiliated with the Ngāpuhi hapū of Ngāti Kawa and Ngāti Rāhiri. In October 2020, the Government committed $66,234 from the Provincial Growth Fund to replacing all roofs at the marae.

Education

Paihia School is a coeducational full primary (years 1–8) school with a roll of  students as of

Climate
Köppen-Geiger climate classification system classifies its climate as oceanic (Cfb), but it is rainier in winter. It has strong subtropical influence and is classified as such under the Trewartha system due to its consistent warm temperatures, and is the mildest weather station in New Zealand.

Notes

External links

 Paihia - Jewel of the Bay of Islands (History - A Time Line)
 Paihia map
 Paihia School website

Far North District
Populated places in the Northland Region
Bay of Islands